was the Japanese ambassador to Denmark from 1980 until 1983. Takahashi was the first female ambassador to Denmark from Japan. 

She “signed the Convention on the Elimination of All Forms of Discrimination against Women, which was the key international convention of the United Nations Decade for Women” in 1980.

References

External links
For Our Daughters: How Outstanding Women Worldwide Have Balanced Home and Career

Ambassadors of Japan to Denmark
Japanese women ambassadors
1916 births
1990 deaths